There was a change of leadership of the Liberal Party of Australia on 5 September 1985 with John Howard replacing Andrew Peacock.

A spill of the deputy leadership of the party took place on that day, Peacock attempting to replace John Howard with his preferred candidate John Moore. The spill was won by Howard over Moore by 38 votes to 31 with 7 members abstaining.

Upon rejection of his candidate for the deputy leadership, Andrew Peacock resigned and was replaced by John Howard as leader defeating Jim Carlton 57 votes to 6. The Deputy leadership was then filled by Neil Brown defeating 11 others (including Moore) for the position.

Background

Initial Deputy Candidates
 John Howard, incumbent Deputy Leader, Shadow Treasurer, Member for Bennelong
 John Moore, Shadow Minister for Communications, Member for Ryan

Withdrawn Candidates
 Michael Hodgman, Shadow Minister for Housing and Construction, Member for Denison

Initial Results

Spill motion to vacate deputy leadership

Deputy leadership ballot

Final Candidates
 Jim Carlton, former Shadow Minister for Health, Member for Mackellar
 John Howard, incumbent Deputy Leader, Member for Bennelong

Results

The following tables gives the ballot results:

Leadership ballot

Deputy leadership ballot

Other candidates in order of elimination:

 Julian Beale and Roger Shipton
 David Connolly
 Steele Hall
 Michael MacKellar
 Wilson Tuckey
 Michael Hodgman
 Jim Carlton

Aftermath

References

Liberal Party of Australia leadership spills
Liberal Party of Australia leadership spill